Fate: The Cursed King is an action role-playing computer game that was developed and published by WildTangent and has been available to play online since 2011. In 2014, gamers were able to purchase the game online via Steam. The game follows the Fate series (originally started in 2005) and will be the final addition to the series.

Plot 

Outside the "Grove" featured in other Fate games, is a land called "Ekbatan". While venturing outside the city seeking adventure, the main character comes across a cave and is drawn inside by a glimmer. Inside, they come across an old chest with writing across it that they cannot read. Opening the chest out of curiosity, they release T'kala, an evil necromantic priest who was executed and sealed in the chest for committing treason against the Cursed King. He proceeds to destroy Ekbatan in an attempt to find and kill the king. Hoping to undo the evil they unleashed, the character sets out to free the king's advisers, find the King, stop T'kala and break the curse. The plot is fairly linear as the progression through the three dungeons all leads to finding the king and his advisers and the eventual defeat of T'kala.

Gameplay and Design 
The game is played from a top-down perspective (birds eye view). Players use the mouse to control the character's movements and attacks, while the keyboard is used to control spells, potions, and healing items which the player can bind certain actions to specific keys. The game also allows the player to mix and match weapons, armor, potions, pets, and other items to work through endless amounts of computer-generated enemies that the player comes in contact with. 

There are two kinds of quests present in the game; the main quest, which tells the overarching story of the game, and various side quests provided by non-player characters. Quests will also have level caps which keep lower-level characters from accomplishing them. These quests can be anything from finding an item to killing a enemy, or other NPC. Rewards for completing quests can include gold, XP or experience, fame points and other various items that help your character.

Weapons, Spells, and Equipment 
There are a variety of items that your character can receive, win, and/or buy in the game. These weapons include axes, swords, spears, bows, knives, clubs, staffs, polearms, and spells. The player is allowed to dual-wield weapons. 

Spells fall into three categories: Attack Magic, Defense Magic, and Charm Magic. Items can be upgraded and enchanted. 

Armor includes helmets, boots, shields, and body armor. 

The game has a variety of other wearable equipment that can enhance the character, such as gloves, belts, rings, necklaces, and earrings. Both weapons and equipment can be obtained by a variety of means. Some items are rewards for quests. Weapons can also be found in dungeons. Items can be purchased and worked on by some of the NPCs throughout the game. In some cases, items can only be utilized when the character is at a certain level.

Pets 
Pets play an important role in Fate: The Cursed King. They can aid the character in the journey by fighting alongside and providing help. They will also pick up and carry items found along the journey. Although pets cannot die, their life bar can run out causing the pet to enter a "fleeing" state when they will be ineffective and will not provide any aid. The pet can be healed by dropping a healing potion on the pet's icon on the top-left of the screen. Pets can be fed fish to change what race they are, as well as change attributes such as attack power and life. Following a 'Determine Your Pet Sweepstakes' that took place on the game's Facebook page, a new in-game pet, Strider, was added.

Levels 
Levels and enemies are all procedurally generated, ensuring that every time a dungeon is entered, it will be different and unique to the player.  The game consists of three dungeons—Caverns of Living Fire, Crypt of T'kala, and then the Haunted Palace—-with over thirty levels each that must be completed in order with each dungeon ending with a boss that the player must kill to free the King's advisers. Players can pursue side quests in the dungeon even after the completion of the main quest.

Character progression 
During the start of the game, players must choose between five races for their character: human, shadow elf, half-orc, cogger, or imp. Each race starts with different base stats. Points gained from leveling up are allocated to strength, dexterity, vitality, and magic.  Adding points to strength will increase damage and allow the character to use heavier weapons. Dexterity points affect attack and defense statistics. Vitality determines stamina and life. Magic will affect mana which will in turn determine what spells can be cast and how powerful the spells the character can use will be. There are also skill points that can be used to level up specific weapon categories including Sword Skill, Club, and Mace Skill, Axe Skill, Spear Skill, Staff Skill, Polearm Skill, Bow, and Crossbow Skill, Critical Strike Skill, Spell casting Skill, Dual wielding Skill, Shield Battle Skill, Attack Magic Skill, Defense Magic Skill, and Charm Magic Skill.

Social aspects 
The game allows the player to recruit AI-controlled companions to fight by its side. It also allows the player to recruit copies of their friends' characters to become AI companions, and lets players connect with Facebook friends who also have the game, giving opportunities to compare characters and trade loot.

References 

Role-playing video games
Windows games
Action role-playing video games
WildTangent games
MacOS games
2011 video games
Dungeon crawler video games
Video games developed in the United States
Video games scored by Adam Gubman
Single-player video games
Encore Software games